Málinec is a village and municipality in the Poltár District in the Banská Bystrica Region of Slovakia. It is located 13 km north of the district center. In the near o Málinec is water reservoir, which supplies several locations in Poltár District. The village is a starting point of the cycling event Novohradský cyklomaratón.

References

External links
 
 
Málinec information  e-obce.sk
Málinec news  sme.sk
Homepage of cycling event

Villages and municipalities in Poltár District